The Colossus of Rhodes (Italian: Il Colosso di Rodi) is a 1961 Italian sword and sandal film co-written and directed by Sergio Leone. Starring Rory Calhoun, it is a fictional account of the island of Rhodes during its classical period in the late third century BCE before coming under Roman control, using the Colossus of Rhodes as a backdrop for the story of a war hero who becomes involved in two different plots to overthrow a tyrannical king: one by Rhodian patriots and the other by Phoenician agents.

The film was Leone's first work as a credited director, in a genre where he already had worked before (as the replacement director for The Last Days of Pompeii and as a secondary director for both Ben-Hur and Quo Vadis). It is perhaps the least known of the seven films he officially directed, and is notable for being the only one without an Ennio Morricone score.

The film is also notable for its unusual time period: The time following Alexander the Great’s death (323 BC) but before the rise of the Roman empire (27 BC), known as the Hellenistic era. Most sword-and-sandal epics of the 1950s and 1960s were set in either classical Greece or even earlier (Hercules, Ulysses, The Giant of Marathon) or the later Roman period (Ben Hur, The Magnificent Gladiator, Quo Vadis). The only other films made during the peplum era to use a Hellenistic setting are Hannibal (1959), Revak the Rebel and Siege of Syracuse (both 1960).

Plot
A Greek military hero named Darios (Rory Calhoun) visits his uncle Lissipu (George Rigaud) on the island of Rhodes in the year 280 BC. Rhodes has just finished constructing an enormous colossal statue of the god Apollo to guard its harbor and is planning an alliance with Phoenicia, which would be hostile to Greece.

Darios flirts with the beautiful Diala (Lea Massari), daughter of the statue's mastermind, Carete (Félix Fernández), while becoming involved with a group of rebels headed by Peliocles (Georges Marchal). These rebels seek to overthrow Rhodes' tyrannical king Serse (Roberto Camardiel); but so does Serse's evil second-in-command, Thar (Conrado San Martín). He has Phoenician soldiers smuggled into Rhodes as slaves, and his men occupy the Colossus to secure safe entrance for the Phoenician fleet.

The rebels learn of this plan and decide to apply to the Greeks for help; Darios, who is forbidden to leave Rhodes as he is suspected a spy, is to serve as an unwitting message carrier. But as they try to exit the harbor under the cover of night, they are foiled by the Colossus's defensive weaponry and arrested; Darios is of course convicted as a fellow conspirator. However, just before the captives are to be executed, the rest of the rebels break them out.

In their hideout, Peliocles decides that the only way to stop the invasion is to control the Colossus and free their fellow rebels who have already been captured and sentenced to work as slaves beneath the Colossus; the release mechanism for the dungeons is located in the statue itself. Darios realizes that without reconnaissance the mission is doomed to fail and tries to enlist Diala's aid. Unfortunately, he foolishly tells her about the rebels' hideout. Diala, who longs for power, betrays Darios and has Thar have the rebels nearly wiped out – with the exceptions of Mirte (Mabel Karr) and Koros (Ángel Aranda), Peliocles' sister and brother, who have managed to hide.

Peliocles and his men are captured and forced to provide amusement in the local arena; but just when Darios arrives to publicly expose the traitor's plot, Thar executes his coup and kills Serse and his retainers. The rebels immediately set out to carry out their plan, but the rebellion seems doomed to fail: Darios is captured while he tries to work the release mechanism to the dungeons, and Koros, who accompanies him, is killed. An all-out assault of the rebels on the Colossus is foiled by its formidable arsenal, which forces them to retreat into the city. Thar's soldiers kill Diala's father, who does not want to see his life's work abused.

An earthquake and a violent storm hit the island just as the enemy fleet is visible on the horizon. Thar and his men flee the Colossus when a tremor shakes the structure violently, only to be slain by the rebels in the city streets. Diala, plagued with remorse, frees Darios but is soon afterwards killed by falling debris. As the quake continues, the Colossus finally topples over and crashes into the harbor bay.

After the fury of nature has passed, Darios and Mirte meet Lissipu outside the ruined city. Lissipu remarks that Darios is now free to leave, but his nephew announces that he will marry Mirte and stay in Rhodes to help make the island peaceful again.

Cast
 Rory Calhoun – Darios
 Lea Massari – Diala
 Georges Marchal – Peliocles
 Conrado San Martín – Thar
 Ángel Aranda – Koros
 Mabel Karr – Mirte
 Mimmo Palmara – Ares
 Roberto Camardiel – King Serse
 Alfio Caltabiano – Creonte
 George Rigaud – Lissipu
 Félix Fernández - Carete

Production
The film was originally meant to star John Derek. However he clashed with Sergio Leone and was replaced by Rory Calhoun.  Derek was fired in June 1960. This resulted in a legal case.

Leone filmed exterior scenes at the Laredo harbour, Cantabria, the Bay of Biscay, the Manzanares el Real and Ciudad Encantada at Cuenca.

Reception
According to MGM records the movie made a profit of $350,000.

Depiction of the Colossus
Although no physical references of the original Helios Colossus are known to exist, the structure is rendered in this film as being an Etruscan image of the god Apollo following the kouros style of sculpture, with a slight “archaic smile.” It is shown to be about 300 feet high (nearly three times the height of its historical counterpart) holding a bowl at chest level with elbows raised outward, straddling each side of the harbor entrance. It is also revealed to be a hollow metal sculpture, much on the same order as the Statue of Liberty, with several interesting features: an interior spiral staircase leading to a second set of stairs at the head of the statue; a chain system that runs practically the height of the statue, which controls sliding doors to a dungeon; permanent openings at the pupils of the eyes and the ears – large enough for a man to pass through; a drawbridge-style door hidden in the center chest that opens to the bowl; the bowl can be filled with burning materials and used as an altar; the fire in the bowl can be dropped on anything beneath by means of a divided trap door on its bottom; and the entire top third of the statue's head has a dodecagonal opening that allows for catapults to be fired out of it.

While the statue in the film is shown to be made of iron and burnished brass (or perhaps bronze) and barefoot, barechested and bareheaded, wearing only a short men's Greek-style skirt and a headband, the original poster depicts the statue as highly polished bronze, completely outfitted with Roman sandals and armor, including a centurion’s imperial galea.

Biography

See also
 List of historical drama films

References

External links

1961 films
1960s disaster films
Peplum films
Italian disaster films
French disaster films
1960s Italian-language films
Films directed by Sergio Leone
Films with screenplays by Sergio Leone
Films set in ancient Greece
Films set in the 3rd century BC
Films set in the Mediterranean Sea
Films shot in Spain
Films about earthquakes
Ancient Rhodes
Films scored by Angelo Francesco Lavagnino
Sword and sandal films
1960s historical films
Films shot in Cantabria
1960s Italian films
1960s French films
Colossus of Rhodes
Films about rebellions